Jaslovské Bohunice is a small village in Slovakia in the Trnava District. It is best known for the nearby Bohunice Nuclear Power Plant complex.

The village arose in 1958 through a merge of Jaslovce (pop. 578 in 1948) and Bohunice (pop. 619 in 1948). The former village of Paderovce was amalgamated in 1976. The first written reference dates back to 1113 (to Bohunice).

See also
 List of municipalities and towns in Slovakia

References

Genealogical resources

The records for genealogical research are available at the state archive "Statny Archiv in Bratislava, Slovakia"

 Roman Catholic church records (births/marriages/deaths): 1768-1896 (parish A)
 Lutheran church records (births/marriages/deaths): 1717-1895 (parish A)

External links
Municipal website 
Surnames of living people in Jaslovske Bohunice

Villages and municipalities in Trnava District